The UK–Dutch Battlegroup or UK/NL EUBG 2010 (Dutch: Brits-Nederlandse Battlegroup or Nederlands-Britse Battlegroup) is an EU Battlegroup led by the United Kingdom, in which the Netherlands also participate. It was on standby during the first half of 2010, simultaneously with Battlegroup I-2010.

The core of the battlegroup was formed by the United Kingdom/Netherlands Amphibious Force (UK/NL AF), that has existed since 1972.

Composition and equipment 
The Dutch provided the 11th Infantry Company of the Korps Mariniers, mortar support, medical support, a logistics detachment, a senior national representative and personnel for a combined headquarters staff. Within the battlegroup, the marines company is embedded in the 42 Commando Royal Marines.

Exercise 
In late November 2009, UK/NL EUBG 2010 conducted exercises, codenamed "Orange Marauder" in the Salisbury Plain Training Area. Evacuation operations, convoy escorting and patrolling, as well as staff functioning, were trained.

References 

Battlegroups of the European Union
Military of the Netherlands
Military of the United Kingdom
Multinational army units and formations
Netherlands–United Kingdom military relations